Tadashi Kawamata ( / born July 24, 1953) is a Japanese artist, born in  Mikasa City on Hokkaido, who lives and works in Paris.

Biography
Born in Mikasa City on Hokkaido, Kawamata graduated from Hokkaido Iwamizawa Higashi High School in 1972. In 1984 he obtained a doctorate from the Tokyo University of the Arts. he was chosen to take part in the Venice Biennale and in 1987, he took part in Documenta in Kassel.

He has been involved in numerous international exhibitions and has performed internationally; and was the director of the Yokohama Triennial in 2005. Professor at the Tokyo University of the Arts from April 1999 to March 2005, he has been teaching since 2007 at the École nationale supérieure des Beaux-Arts in Paris. He has also been invited teacher at the École Nationale Supérieure d'Architecture de Versailles -ENSAV-.

Works
"Tetra House N-3 W-26" 1983 in Sapporo

Gallery

References

External links

 official website
 Kamel Mennour
 Annely Juda Fine Art in London
 Tadashi Kawamata, photographs, Canadian Centre for Architecture (digitized items)

1953 births
People from Mikasa, Hokkaido
People from Tokyo
Artists from Paris
Living people
Japanese contemporary artists
Artists from Hokkaido
Tokyo University of the Arts alumni
Academic staff of Tokyo University of the Arts
Academic staff of the École des Beaux-Arts